Bill Nicholson may refer to:

 Bill Nicholson (cricketer) (1909–2001), Scottish cricketer
 Bill Nicholson (baseball) (1914–1996), American Major League Baseball player
 Bill Nicholson (footballer) (1919–2004), English football player and manager
 Bill Nicholson (Canadian administrator), Canadian farmer and administrator

See also
 Billy Nicholson (disambiguation)
 William Nicholson (disambiguation)